Picardy is an Australian winery at Pemberton, in the Pemberton wine region of Western Australia.  It was established in 1993 by Dr. Bill Pannell, his wife Sandra and their son Daniel; Bill and Sandra Pannell had previously founded the pioneering Moss Wood winery in the Margaret River wine region in 1969.

See also

 Australian wine
 List of wineries in Western Australia
 Western Australian wine

References

Notes

Bibliography

External links
Picardy – official site

Companies established in 1993
Pemberton, Western Australia
Wineries in Western Australia
1993 establishments in Australia